The Autumn Nations Cup was a rugby union competition held in November and December 2020 in place of the usual Autumn internationals series typically held in the same period each year, as many teams were avoiding extended travel due to the COVID-19 pandemic. Eight teams participated – the teams involved in the Six Nations Championship (England, France, Ireland, Italy, Scotland, and Wales) plus Georgia and Fiji – divided into two groups of four. Japan were originally going to take part but withdrew due to travel restrictions, resulting in them being replaced by Georgia and moving Fiji to Group B.

Each team played the others in its group once to determine the final group standings; the teams in first place in each group then played each other, as did the teams in second, third, and fourth, to determine the overall standings. The tournament opened with a match between Ireland and Wales at the Aviva Stadium on 13 November 2020, and the final matches were hosted by the teams from Group A on the weekend of 5/6 December 2020 (Georgia's "home" match was played at Murrayfield Stadium in Edinburgh, Scotland). Wales' home matches were played at Parc y Scarlets due to the Millennium Stadium being decommissioned as a COVID-19 hospital. Fiji were forced to concede all of their group games due to a COVID-19 outbreak in their team camp, but they were able to face Georgia in the 7th/8th-place playoff.

England won the tournament after wins over Ireland, Wales, Georgia, and France.

Overview

Participants
World Rugby rankings denoted in (parentheses) as per start of the tournament

Venues

Fixtures

Group A

Round 1

Notes:
Jacob Stockdale and Iain Henderson were named to start but were ruled out on matchday and replaced by Quinn Roux and Andrew Conway; Tadhg Beirne was added to the bench. 
Billy Burns and James Lowe (both Ireland) and Callum Sheedy (Wales) made their international debuts.
Tomas Francis (Wales) earned his 50th test cap.
George North became the seventh Wales player to earn 100 test caps (97 for Wales, 3 for the British and Irish Lions). He also became the youngest player to earn his 100th cap at 28 years and 225 days, surpassing Australia's Michael Hooper's record of 28 years and 348 days.
Johnny Sexton became the seventh Ireland player to earn 100 test caps (94 for Ireland, 6 for the British and Irish Lions).
Alun Wyn Jones became the first player to earn 150 test caps (141 for Wales, 9 for the British and Irish Lions).

Notes:
Demur Tapladze had been named on the bench for Georgia, but was withdrawn ahead of kick off and replaced by Giorgi Javakhia.
Max Malins, Jack Willis (both England) and Sandro Svanidze (Georgia) made their international debuts.
Jamie George became the first England men's hooker to score a hat-trick.
The two nations faced each other outside of a Rugby World Cup for the first time.

Round 2

Notes:
James Botham, Kieran Hardy, Ioan Lloyd and Johnny Williams (all Wales) made their international debuts.
Joy Neville became the first woman to perform television match official duties in a major men's international competition.

Round 3

Notes:
Shane Daly (Ireland) and Mikheil Alania and Davit Niniashvili (both Georgia) made their international debuts.

Group B

Round 1

Notes:
Jacopo Trulla and Stephen Varney (both Italy) made their international debuts.

Round 2

Notes:
Scotland lost at home to France for the first time since 2014.

Round 3

Notes:
Jean-Pascal Barraque, Teddy Baubigny, Louis Carbonel, Cyril Cazeaux, Kilian Geraci, Hassane Kolingar, Yoram Moefana, Rodrigue Neti, Baptiste Pesenti, Swan Rebbadj, Gabin Villière (all France), Michele Lamaro and Cristian Stoian (both Italy) made their international debuts.
Nigel Owens became the first referee to officiate 100 test matches.

Finals

7th/8th place play-off

Notes:
Haereiti Hetet, Tevita Ikanivere, Mesulame Kunavula, Simione Kuruvoli, Temo Mayanavanua, Chris Minimbi, Manueli Ratuniyarawa and Samu Tawake (all Fiji) made their international debuts.

5th/6th place play-off

Notes:
Monty Ioane (Italy) made his international debut.
Johnny Williams (Wales) was named to start at inside centre, but picked up an injury ahead of kick-off and Jonathan Davies replaced him in the starting XV.

3rd/4th place play-off

Notes:
Eric O'Sullivan (Ireland) and Jaco van der Walt (Scotland) made their international debuts.
Sean Maitland (Scotland) earned his 50th test cap.
Stuart McInally (Scotland) was named among the replacements, but was replaced before kick-off by George Turner.

1st/2nd place play-off

Notes:
Guillaume Ducat and Selevasio Tolofua (both France) made their international debuts.

Final standings

Player statistics

Most points

Most tries

See also
2020 end-of-year rugby union internationals
2020 Six Nations Championship

Notes

References

External links
Autumn Nations Cup Website

2020 in rugby union
2020 rugby union tournaments for national teams
2020–21 in European rugby union
2020–21 in English rugby union
2020–21 in French rugby union
2020–21 in Irish rugby union
2020–21 in Italian rugby union
2020–21 in Scottish rugby union
2020–21 in Welsh rugby union
November 2020 sports events in Europe
December 2020 sports events in Europe
November 2020 sports events in the United Kingdom
December 2020 sports events in the United Kingdom
2020 in Fijian rugby union
2020 in Georgian sport